Sudha Chaudhry (born 1 July 1961) is an Indian field hockey player. She competed in the women's tournament at the 1980 Summer Olympics.

References

External links
 

1961 births
Living people
Indian female field hockey players
Olympic field hockey players of India
Field hockey players at the 1980 Summer Olympics
Place of birth missing (living people)
Medalists at the 1982 Asian Games
Field hockey players at the 1982 Asian Games
Asian Games gold medalists for India
Asian Games medalists in field hockey